Taven Coal Bryan (born March 11, 1996) is an American football defensive tackle for the Indianapolis Colts of the National Football League (NFL). He played college football at Florida.

Early years
Bryan attended Natrona County High School in Casper, Wyoming, where he played high school football. He was the top-ranked football recruit in Wyoming in the class of 2014. He committed to the University of Florida to play college football.

College career
Bryan played at Florida from 2014 to 2017. During his career he had 65 tackles, four sacks, and one interception. After his junior season in 2017, Bryan decided to forgo his senior year and enter the 2018 NFL Draft.

Professional career

Jacksonville Jaguars
Bryan was drafted by the Jacksonville Jaguars in the first round (29th overall) of the 2018 NFL Draft.  On July 17, 2018, Bryan signed a four-year, $10.2 million contract with the Jaguars.

The Jaguars declined to exercise the fifth-year option on Bryan's contract on May 3, 2021, making him a free agent after the 2021 season.

Cleveland Browns
On March 16, 2022, Bryan signed a one-year contract with the Cleveland Browns.

Indianapolis Colts
On March 17, 2023, Bryan signed a one-year contract with the Indianapolis Colts.

References

External links
Florida Gators bio
Jacksonville Jaguars bio

1996 births
Living people
Sportspeople from Casper, Wyoming
Players of American football from Wyoming
American football defensive tackles
Florida Gators football players
Jacksonville Jaguars players
Cleveland Browns players
Indianapolis Colts players